Mohamed El Zonfouly (born 28 April 1992), also transliterated El Zonfoly or El Zanfaly, is an Egyptian footballer who plays for Egyptian Premier League side Al Ittihad as a goalkeeper.

References

1992 births
Living people
Egyptian footballers
Association football goalkeepers
Egyptian Premier League players
Wadi Degla SC players
El Minya SC players
Tala'ea El Gaish SC players
Aswan SC players
El Raja SC players
Al Ittihad Alexandria Club players